Loiseau is a French surname, most prevalent in Loiret.

People
 Gustave Loiseau (1865–1935), French painter
 Marion C. Loizeaux (b. 1904), American army physician in World War II
 Carlos Loiseau (1948–2012), Argentine cartoonist 
 Dominique Loiseau (1949–2013), French and Swiss watchmaker 
 Bernard Loiseau (1951–2003), French chef
Annick Loiseau (born 1957), French physicist
 Philippe Loiseau (born 1957), French politician 
 Patrick Loiseau (born 1960), French politician 
 Nathalie Loiseau (born 1964), French diplomat and academic administrator
 Hervé Djamel Loiseau (born 1973), French soldier
 David Loiseau (born 1979), Haitian-Canadian mixed martial arts fighter
 Shawn Loiseau (born 1989), American footballer

French-language surnames
Surnames of French origin